Noisettes, a British band based in London, have released three studio albums, ten singles, three extended plays (EPs) and eleven music videos. They have also been credited as featured artists in one single, as well as making appearances on other albums. Predominantly an indie rock band, Noisettes' music incorporates other styles of musical genres, including rock and post-punk revival.

Founded in 2003 by lead singer and bassist Shingai Shoniwa, guitarist Dan Smith, (both from band Sonarfly), and drummer James Morrison. Under the name "NOISEttes", the three recorded their first release, a four-song EP entitled Three Moods of the Noisettes, issued by Side Salad Records in 2005. In 2007, Noisettes released their debut album, What's the Time Mr Wolf? on label Vertigo Records. Described as garage-rock and compared to work by Green Day, the album peaked at number 75 on the UK Albums Chart despite positive critical reception and heavy promotion.

The Noisettes are most well known for their 2009 single release "Don't Upset the Rhythm (Go Baby Go)", which debuted and reached a peak of number two on the UK Singles Chart, and was their first single to chart outside the UK. Following the successful release of "Go Baby Go", the Noisettes released their second studio album, Wild Young Hearts on 20 April 2009. The album saw the Noisettes move from mainstream styles to other genres such as "jazz fusion"-influenced pop and "hard-edged indie rock". Wild Young Hearts achieved number seven on the UK Albums Chart, as well as managing to chart in other European countries. The band released the first single from their third album Contact, titled "Winner" on 9 July 2012.

Albums

Studio albums

Extended plays

Singles

As lead artists

As featured artists

Other charted songs

Notes
A ^ Charity single, listed as "contributors" to the song.

Music videos

Notes
B ^ The music video for "Wild Young Hearts" was made up of footage of a Noisettes performance at the Proud Gallery in Camden, London.
C ^ The music video for "Saturday Night" was made up of recordings by fans using only Nokia mobile devices, at an exclusive live performance in East London. The video was recorded for "Shot By Fans", to which it was made available for them to create their own versions online.

Other appearances
The following have been officially released, but do not feature on any recordings by Noisettes:

See also
 List of songs recorded by Noisettes

References
General

Specific

External links

Noisettes at MusicBrainz
Noisettes at Rolling Stone discographies

Discographies of British artists
Rock music group discographies